Mickey S. Michaels (October 9, 1931 – March 20, 1999) was an American set decorator. He was nominated for two Academy Awards in the category Best Art Direction.

Selected filmography
Michaels was nominated for two Academy Awards for Best Art Direction:
 Airport (1970)
 Airport '77 (1977)

References

External links

1931 births
1999 deaths
American set decorators
Artists from Santa Monica, California